École nationale supérieure d'électricité et de mécanique de Nancy (ENSEM) a French public engineering College created in 1900.

The school offers an energy engineering degree which offers the choice between three majors in the second and third year, each attached to a department:

 Systems energy: mechanical department;
 Electrical energy: electrical engineering department;
 System, information, energy: automated systems engineering department.

Located in Nancy, the ENSEM is a member of the National Polytechnic Institute of Lorraine as well as the University of Lorraine.

Notable alumni 
 Ary Abramovich Sternfeld, co-creator of the modern aerospace science 
 Felix Zandman, a Polish-born American entrepreneur and founder of Vishay Intertechnology

References

External links
 ENSEM

Engineering universities and colleges in France
ENSEM
Nancy, France
Educational institutions established in 1900
1900 establishments in France